The Liberty Correctional Institution  is a state prison for men located in Bristol, Liberty County, Florida, owned and operated by the Florida Department of Corrections.  

Liberty has a mix of security levels, including minimum, medium, and close, for adult male offenders.  Liberty first opened in 1989 and has a maximum capacity of 1330 prisoners.

References

Prisons in Florida
Buildings and structures in Liberty County, Florida
1989 establishments in Florida